Papyrus 11 (in the Gregory-Aland numbering), signed by 𝔓11, is a copy of a part of the New Testament in Greek. It is a papyrus manuscript of the First Epistle to the Corinthians. It contains fragments 1 Corinthians 1:17-22; 2:9-12.14; 3:1-3,5-6; 4:3; 5:5-5.7-8; 6:5-9.11-18; 7:3-6.10-11.12-14. Only some portions of the codex can be read.

The manuscript palaeographically had been assigned to the 7th century.

The Greek text of this codex is a representative of the Alexandrian text-type. Aland placed it in Category II.

In 1 Corinthians 7:5 it reads τη προσευχη (prayer) – along with 𝔓46, א*, A, B, C, D, F, G, P, Ψ, 6, 33, 81, 104, 181, 629, 630, 1739, 1877, 1881, 1962, it vg, cop, arm, eth; other manuscripts have reading τη νηστεια και τη προσευχη (fasting and prayer) or τη προσευχη και νηστεια (prayer and fasting).

The manuscript was discovered by Tischendorf in 1862.

It is currently housed at the Russian National Library (Gr. 258A) in Saint-Petersburg.

See also 

 1 Corinthians 1-7
 List of New Testament papyri
 Papyrus 14

References

Further reading 

 K. Aland, Neutestamentliche Papyri NTS 3 (1957), pp. 267–278.
 A. H. Salonius, Die griechischen Handschriftenfragmente des Neuen Testaments in den Staatlichen Museen zu Berlin, ZNW 26 (1927), pp. 97–119.

External links 
 Digital image of P11 at CSNTM

New Testament papyri
7th-century biblical manuscripts
National Library of Russia collection
First Epistle to the Corinthians papyri